Anne Simpkin Meredith (born 2 April 1969) is a British former professional tennis player.

A right-handed player from Leicestershire, Simpkin reached a career best ranking of 200 in the world while competing on the professional tour.

Simpkin featured as a wildcard in the singles main draw at Wimbledon on three occasions. Her best performance on the WTA Tour came at Eastbourne in 1989, where she had a first round win over Julie Salmon, before losing in the second round to Mary Joe Fernandez. She won one singles and three doubles titles on the ITF circuit.

ITF finals

Singles: 2 (1–1)

Doubles: 7 (3–4)

References

External links
 
 

1969 births
Living people
British female tennis players
English female tennis players
Tennis people from Leicestershire